Arthur E. Watson (12 July 1913 – 1995) was an English footballer who made 82 appearances in the Football League playing as a full back for Lincoln City, Chesterfield and Hull City.

References 

1913 births
1995 deaths
People from Hemsworth
English footballers
Association football fullbacks
Lincoln City F.C. players
Chesterfield F.C. players
Hull City A.F.C. players
English Football League players
Date of death missing
Footballers from Yorkshire